The Society of the Spectacle is a 1967 work of philosophy and Marxist critical theory by Guy Debord, in which the author develops and presents the concept of the Spectacle. The book is considered a seminal text for the Situationist movement.  Debord published a follow-up book Comments on the Society of the Spectacle in 1988.

Summary
The work is a series of 221 short theses in the form of aphorisms. Each thesis contains one paragraph.

Degradation of human life
Debord traces the development of a modern society in which authentic social life has been replaced with its representation: "All that once was directly lived has become mere representation." Debord argues that the history of social life can be understood as "the decline of being into having, and having into merely appearing." This condition, according to Debord, is the "historical moment at which the commodity completes its colonization of social life."

The spectacle is the inverted image of society in which relations between commodities have supplanted relations between people, in which "passive identification with the spectacle supplants genuine activity". "The spectacle is not a collection of images," Debord writes, "rather, it is a social relation among people, mediated by images."

In his analysis of the spectacular society, Debord notes that the quality of life is impoverished, with such a lack of authenticity that human perceptions are affected, and an attendant degradation of knowledge, which in turn hinders critical thought. Debord analyzes the use of knowledge to assuage reality: the spectacle obfuscates the past, imploding it with the future into an undifferentiated mass, a type of never-ending present; in this way the spectacle prevents individuals from realizing that the society of spectacle is only a moment in history, one that can be overturned through revolution.

In the Situationist view, situations are actively created moments characterized by "a sense of self-consciousness of existence within a particular environment or ambience".

Debord encouraged the use of détournement, "which involves using spectacular images and language to disrupt the flow of the spectacle."

Mass media and commodity fetishism
The Society of the Spectacle is a critique of contemporary consumer culture and commodity fetishism, dealing with issues such as class alienation, cultural homogenization, and mass media. When Debord says that "All that was once directly lived has become mere representation," he is referring to the central importance of the image in contemporary society. Images, Debord says, have supplanted genuine human interaction. Thus, Debord's fourth thesis is: "The spectacle is not a collection of images; rather, it is a social relationship between people that is mediated by images." In a consumer society, social life is not about living, but about having; the spectacle uses the image to convey what people need and must have. Consequently, social life moves further, leaving a state of "having" and proceeding into a state of "appearing"; namely the appearance of the image. "In a world which really is topsy-turvy, the true is a moment of the false."

Comparison between religion and marketing
Debord also draws an equivalence between the role of mass media marketing in the present and the role of religions in the past. The spread of commodity-images by the mass media, produces "waves of enthusiasm for a given product" resulting in "moments of fervent exaltation similar to the ecstasies of the convulsions and miracles of the old religious fetishism".

Debord contends further that "the remains of religion and of the family (the principal relic of the heritage of class power) and the moral repression they assure, merge whenever the enjoyment of this world is affirmed–this world being nothing other than repressive pseudo-enjoyment." "The monotheistic religions were a compromise between myth and history, ... These religions arose on the soil of history, and established themselves there. But there they still preserve themselves in radical opposition to history." Debord defines them as Semi-historical religion. "The growth of knowledge about society, which includes the understanding of history as the heart of culture, derives from itself an irreversible knowledge, which is expressed by the destruction of God."

Critique of American sociology
In Chapter 8, "Negation and Consumption Within Culture", Debord includes a critical analysis of the works of three American sociologists. Debord discusses at length Daniel J. Boorstin's The Image (1961), arguing that Boorstin missed the concept of Spectacle. In thesis 192, Debord mentions some American sociologists who have described the general project of developed capitalism which "aims to recapture the fragmented worker as a personality well integrated in the group;" the examples mentioned by Debord are David Riesman, author of The Lonely Crowd (1950), and William H. Whyte, author of the 1956 bestseller The Organization Man. Among the 1950s sociologists who are usually compared to Riesman and Whyte, is C. Wright Mills, author of White Collar: The American Middle Classes. Riesman's "Lonely Crowd" term is also used in thesis 28.

Authenticity, plagiarism, and Lautréamont

Because the notion of the spectacle involves real life being replaced by representations of life, Society of the Spectacle is also concerned with the notion of authenticity versus inauthenticity, a theme which is revisited in Chapter 8, "Negation and Consumption within Culture".  In Debord's treatment, modern society forces culture to constantly re-appropriate or re-invent itself, copying and re-packaging old ideas.  Thesis 207 makes this point, rhetorically:

"Ideas improve.  The meaning of words participates in the improvement.  Plagiarism is necessary.  Progress implies it.  It embraces an author's phrase, makes use of his expressions, erases a false idea, and replaces it with the right idea."

This passage concerning plagiarism is itself directly lifted from Poésies by French-Uruguayan author Isidore Lucien Ducasse, better known as the Comte de Lautréamont.  In particular, the original French text for both Debord and Lautréamont's versions of the passage are identical: "Les idées s'améliorent. Le sens des mots y participe. Le plagiat est nécessaire. Le progrès l'implique. Il serre de près la phrase d'un auteur, se sert de ses expressions, efface une idée fausse, la remplace par l'idée juste."

Translations and editions
Translation by Fredy Perlman and friends (Black & Red, 1970; rev. ed. 1977). 
Translation by Donald Nicholson-Smith (Zone, 1994).
Translation by Ken Knabb (Rebel Press, 2004; annotated ed.: Bureau of Public Secrets, 2014).

1983 edition

The book cover of the 1983 edition is derived from a photograph by the Life magazine photographer, J. R. Eyerman. On November 26, 1952, at the Paramount Theatre (Oakland, California), the premiere screening of the film Bwana Devil by Arch Oboler took place as the first full-length, color 3-D (aka 'Natural Vision') motion picture. Eyerman took a series of photographs of the audience wearing 3-D glasses.

Life magazine used one of the photographs as the cover of a brochure about the 1946-1955 decade. The photograph employed in the Black and Red edition shows the audience in "a virtually trance-like state of absorption, their faces grim, their lips pursed;" however, in the one chosen by Life, "the spectators are laughing, their expressions of hilarity conveying the pleasure of an uproarious, active spectatorship." The Black and Red version also is flipped left to right, and cropped. Despite widespread association among English-speaking readers, Debord had nothing to do with this cover illustration, which was chosen by Black and Red.

See also
 Culture industry
 History and Class Consciousness
 Hyperreality
 Vance Packard
 No Logo
Spectacle (critical theory)

Notes

References
Brush, Kathryn (2005) The Unshaken Tree: Walter W. S. Cook on Kunstwissenschaft in 1924 in Deborah J. Johnson, David Ogawa, Kermit Swiler Champa Seeing and Beyond: A Festschrift on Eighteenth to Twenty-First Century Art in Honor of Kermit S. Champa,  ed. Deborah J. Johnson and David Ogawa (Bern, Berlin, Frankfurt and New York: Peter Lang Verlag
Debord (1977) [1967] The Society of the Spectacle, translation by Fredy Perlman and Jon Supak (Black & Red, 1970; rev. ed. 1977). Online at Library.nothingness.org (accessdate=2011-08-20)
Debord (1994) [1967] The Society of the Spectacle, translation by Donald Nicholson-Smith (New York: Zone Books). Online at Cddc.vt.edu (accessdate=2011-08-20)
Ford, Simon (1950) The Situationist International: A User's Guide

Further reading
An Illustrated Guide to Guy Debord’s The Society of the Spectacle, by Tiernan Morgan & Lauren Purje, at Hyperallergic.com, 10 Aug 2016
A critical review of Guy Debord's analysis of the spectacle at Academia.edu
, free audiobook from the Audio Anarchy project

External links

The Society of the Spectacle full text at marxists.org
Translation from the Situationist International Library
Translation by Donald Nicholson-Smith
Translation by Ken Knabb
Observations on the English translation of Guy Debord's Oeuvres Cinématographiques Completes (Broken.)
Pdf of the original 1970 English translation in Radical America

1967 non-fiction books
20th-century philosophy
Books about crowd psychology
Books about Marxism
Books about revolutions
Books about the media
Contemporary philosophical literature
Critical theory
French non-fiction books
Literature critical of work and the work ethic
Marxist books
Non-fiction books about consumerism
Situationist writings
Sociology books
Works about avant-garde and experimental art
Works by Guy Debord
Books of aphorisms